Michael Manring (born June 27, 1960) is an American bass guitarist from the San Francisco Bay Area.

Biography
Michael Manring was born in Annapolis, Maryland, as the youngest of four children. His family lived in Norfolk, Virginia and moved to the suburbs of Washington, D.C. in 1969.  The Manrings were a very active family musically, providing a very fertile background for Michael's musical development. He and his brother Doug—a guitarist and drummer, later living a long time in Japan—formed a very active rhythm group while in high school, venturing through jazz rock and fusion, playing rock classics at beer parties or pop standards in restaurants and at weddings.

Manring was a pupil of bassist Peter Princiotto from Spring Hill area, Virginia. He began to study at Berklee College of Music in Boston, Massachusetts in the late 1970s, but canceled his studies in 1979 because of the heavy workload he already had, touring with several different bands like the Prog Rock band However. During his time at Berklee College he used every opportunity to play with very different musicians and bands. In the 1980s he studied and toured with Jaco Pastorius and began to develop his own style.

In addition to a long tenure in the 1980s as house bassist for Windham Hill Records, Manring has recorded with Spastic Ink, Alex Skolnick (in the bands Skol-Patrol and Attention Deficit, also featuring Tim Alexander from Primus), Larry Kassin, Tom Darter, Steve Morse, David Cullen, Alex de Grassi, Will Ackerman and many other noted musicians. He headlined his own band, Montreux, throughout the 1980s. He has been a member of Yo Miles!, Henry Kaiser and Wadada Leo Smith's Miles Davis tribute band, since its inception. In 1994 Manring was polled Bassist of the Year by the readers of Bass Player magazine. Manring's name is also tied with that of fingerstyle guitarist Michael Hedges, who was a dear friend and fellow musician. Manring toured extensively with Hedges and played on all Hedges albums except one. Manring is known as a humble and gracious live performer with a gift for improvisation with guest musicians.

Since 2005 Manring is member of the band DeMania with guitarist Alex de Grassi and percussionist Christopher Garcia. Manring remains active, touring the world for performances and clinics. He lives in Oakland, California. In 2020 he has collaborated with the Art of Peace global project, composed and arranged by Mehran Alirezaei.

Music and musical influences
Because of his association with the Windham Hill label Manring often was seen as a New Age musician. He doesn't see himself as belonging to a certain style or genre and often jokes about categorising his music. His album Thonk he termed for example "... the first New Age–Death metal–Fusion–album".

Manring has a solid musical knowledge and uses the bass as a solo instrument usually in alternate tunings, with additional possibilities and patterns invoked on the fly with lever-activated de-tuners and bridges, somewhat like a pedal steel guitar. He wants to show that the electric bass can be used in a musically rich and expressive way. Manring occasionally plays on two (or even three or four) basses at the same time during live performances. Manring is also a composer of experimental music, mixing technology and fretless bass with the sounds of kitchen implements and cardboard boxes, evidenced on his "Book of Flame" solo album.

He is a technical virtuoso, generally using his bass in very different ways. Mostly he plays a fretless bass, which gives him ample possibilities to change tone and pitch just like on acoustic bass. Manring is rhythmically very versatile and often uses polyrhythms. He's said to do "... things on the electric bass that haven't been done before, are nearly impossible, and (are) illegal in most states.". A unique technique employed by Manring is utilising Hipshot D tuners to change the tuning of one or more strings over the course of playing a piece.

Equipment
Manring plays a custom bass by Zon Guitars, the so-called Zon Hyperbass, a very flexible instrument, which was developed by Joseph Zon and Manring. Special tuning pegs and a special bridge allow instantaneous tuning change of single strings as well as of all strings simultaneously by the action of several tiny levers, a system like that of the TransTrem guitar. The development of this special model was caused by Manring's use of open tunings. When Manring began changing tunings during pieces by turning the pegs while playing, he soon realised the limitations of this approach. First he tried to overcome these limitations by changing a normal Music Man Sting Ray Bass, but then began to develop the Hyperbass with Zon. The Hyperbass has Bartolini pickups for every string and four Fishman transducers for the body signals of the instruments.

Apart from the Hyperbass, Manring uses a whole fleet of instruments. A listing at his website gives the following models:

 Zon Legacy Elite Special fretless, aka "Bub"
 Homemade Jazz Bass-style fretless
 Zon Michael Manring Hyperbass
 Zon Custom Fretless, aka "Junior" or "Son of Bub"
 Larrivee 5-string fretless acoustic bass guitar
 MusicMan Stingray fretless
 Paroutaud Music Laboratories 5-string fretless Infinite Sustain prototype
 PRS fretless
 Riverhead Unicorn fretless
 Riverhead Unicorn fretted bass
 Zon prototype headless fretted bass, aka "Vinny"
 Zon Legacy Elite 6-string fretless
 Zon prototype Legacy 10-string bass (5 x 2).

Manring uses Markbass amplifiers and EBow/PlusBow.

Discography

Solo
 1986 Unusual Weather (Windham Hill)
 1989 Toward the Center of the Night (Windham Hill)
 1991 Drastic Measures (Windham Hill)
 1994 Thonk (High Street)
 1995 Up Close 21 (Windham Hill/High Street/Boston Acoustic)
 1998 The Book of Flame (Alchemy)
 2005 Soliloquy (Manthing)
 2020 Small Moments (Manthing)

Collaborations

 with Michael Hedges
 1981 Breakfast in the Field (Windham Hill)
 1984 Aerial Boundaries (Windham Hill)
 1986 Watching My Life Go By (Open Air)
 1987 Live on the Double Planet (Windham Hill)
 1990 Taproot (Windham Hill)
 1996 Oracle (Windham Hill)
 1999 Torched (Windham Hill)
 2000 Michael Hedges – The Best of Michael Hedges (Windham Hill)
 2001 Beyond Boundaries – Guitar Solos (Windham Hill)
 2003 Platinum & Gold Collection (RCA Victor)
 2006 Pure Michael Hedges (RCA)

 with Calum Graham
 2016 Farewell (Studio AD/TL Studios)

 with Danny Heines
 2001 What Worlds They Bring (Vadadisc)

 with Alex Skolnick
 1997 The Skol-Patrol (Pluto-Bound)

 with Montreux
 1985 Chiaroscuro (Windham Hill)
 1987 Sign Language (Windham Hill)
 1989 Let Them Say (Windham Hill)

 with Jim Stinnett and Grant Stinnett
 2008 Project M (Stinnett)
 2009 Dance of the Bottom Feeders (Stinnett)
 2011 Welcome to Our Clef (Stinnett)
 2012 Convergencia (Stinnett)

 with John Gorka
 1991 Jack's Crows (High Street)
 1992 Temporary Road (High Street)
 1994 Out of the Valley (High Street)
 1996 Between Five and Seven (High Street)
 1998 After Yesterday (Red House)
 2001 Company You Keep (Red House)
 2006 Writing in the Margins (Red House)

 with Paolo Giordano
 1994 Paolo Giordano (Step Musique/New Sounds)
 2000 Kid in a Toy Shop (Step Musique/New Sounds)

 with Turtle Island String Quartet
 1995 By the Fireside (Windham Hill)

 with Attention Deficit
 1998 Attention Deficit (Magna Carta)
 2001 The Idiot King (Magna Carta)

 with Jeff Loomis
 2008 Zero Order Phase (Century Media)

 with Yo Miles
 1998 Yo Miles! (Shanachie)
 2004 Sky Garden (Cuneiform)
 2005 Upriver (Cuneiform)

 with Sadhappy
 1998 Good Day Bad Dream (Periscope)
 2005 Outerspaces (Periscope)

 with Norm Stockton
 2009 Tea in the Typhoon (Stocktones)

 with Scott McGill and Vic Stevens
 2001 Addition by Subtraction (Free Electric Sound)
 2003 Controlled by Radar (Free Electric Sound)
 2006 What We Do (Free Electric Sound)

 with Larry Kassin and Tom Darter
 2001 Scatter (MKD Music)

 with David Cullen
 2001 Equilibré (Solid Air)

 with Human Factor
 2002 Human Factor (Human Factor)

 with Euro Groove Department
 2005 Optical Illusion

 with At War With Self
 2005 Torn Between Dimensions (Free Electric Sound)

 with DeMania
 2006 DeMania (Tropo)

 with Jonni Lightfoot
2006 "BLU" (DreamAttik Productions)

 with Jeff Dodd
 2007 Falling Awake (Aesthetic)

 with Jeff Titus
 2007 Wood Dragon (Musician101 Music)
 2011 What We Don't Know (Jeff Titus Music)

 with Brad Hoyt and Jeff Titus
 2013 Restive Nocture (Harp Guitar Music)

 with Jim Matheos
 1999 Away with Words

 with Yves Carbonne and Dominique Di Piazza
 2005 Carbonne – Di Piazza – Manring

 with Justin King (as King West Manring Vamos)
 2008 I-XII

 with Cyril Achard
 2008 A Place in Time

 with Sándor Szabó
 2010 Inner Smile (Indie Europe/Zoom)

 with Lukas Ligeti
 2011 Pattern Time (Innova)

 with Terror Syndrome
 2008 Terror Syndrome

 with Kevin Kastning
2013 "In Winter" (Greydisc Records)

 with Shambhu
 2010 "Sacred Love" (Acoustic Shine)
 2016  "Soothe" (Acoustic Shine)

 with Marco Maggiore
 2014 PassWords (M81Productions)

 with Tim Jordan Kirtan
 2015 Heart and Spirit (Dharmapala Records)

 with Vectrexcentricity
 2016 Lifelike Boy Android (H(i)nds(i)ght)

 with Gianfranco Continenza
 2013 Dusting the Time (Videoradio, VRCD 000844)
 2019 Vertical Horizons (Never Sleeping Records, NS 001)

Compilations

 Windham Hill
 1982 An Evening with Windham Hill Live
 1985 Windham Hill – Winter
 1985 Windham Hill Sampler '86 
 1985 Windham Hill Sampler '85
 1986 A Winter's Solstice II
 1989 Windham Hill Radio Sampler I
 1990 Windham Hill – The First Ten Years
 1990 A Winter's Solstice III
 1990 Restore the Shore
 1991 Windham Hill Sampler '92
 1991 Windham Hill Guitar Sampler II
 1993 A Winter's Solstice IV
 1995 Heal the Bay
 1996 Sanctuary – 20 Years of Windham Hill
 1996 Redbook Relaxers – Daybreak
 1996 Redbook Relaxers – Dreamscape
 1996 Carols of Christmas
 1997 Summer Solstice – A Windham Hill Collection
 1997 Redbook Relaxers – Lullabies
 1997 Redbook Relaxers – Dinner Party
 1997 Redbook Relaxers – Between Friends
 1997 Redbook Relaxers – After Hours
 1997 Redbook Relaxers – Piano Reflections
 1998 Thanksgiving – A Windham Hill Collection
 1998 Yoga Zone – Music for Yoga Practice
 1998 Conversations with God II
 1999 Sun Dance – Summer Solstice III
 2000 Windham Hill Classics – Morning
 2000 Windham Hill Classics – Journeys
 2000 Windham Hill Classics – Harvest
 2000 Windham Hill Classics – Angels
 2000 The Mozart Variations
 2002 Spirit of Life
 2003 Windham Hill Chill II
 2003 Prayer – A Windham Hill Collection
 2003 Adagio – A Windham Hill Collection
 2003 A Winter's Solstice V
 2003 A Windham Hill Wedding Album
 2004 Winter Wonderland – A Windham Hill Collection
 2004 Lullaby – A Windham Hill Collection
 2005 A Quiet Revolution – 30 Years of Windham Hill
 2005 Essential Winter's Solstice

 BMG
 1997 Twilight Jazz
 1997 Meditation – Revive
 1997 Candlelight Moments – Romantic Moments
 1997 Candlelight Moments – Meditative Moments
 1998 Moonlight Reflections
 1998 Quiet Moods – Romantic Reflections
 1998 Quiet Moods – Meditative Moments
 2000 New Age Christmas
 2000 Awake
 2000 Yoga – Energy
 2000 Yoga – Balance Energy and Strength
 2001 Meditation – Relax Restore and Revive
 2002 Meditation – Renew
 2002 Meditation – Relax

 Other labels
 1994 We Sing to Open Ears (High Street)
 1996 Different Mozart (Philips)
 1997 Heritage (Polygram )
 1997 A Very Green Christmas (Seventh Wave)
 1999 Moonlight Moments (Columbia River)
 1999 Soundscape – New Age Reflections (Delta/BMG)
 1999 Bass Talk, Vol. 6 (Hot Wire)
 1999 Bass Day '98 (Hudson Music)
 2000 Dreamscape (Delta)
 2003 Guitar Harvest I (Solid Air)
 2004 Healing Garden – The Art of Relaxation (Madacy)
 2005 Brazil Duets (Adventure Music)
 2006 Woodsongs: An Acoustic Guitar Collection (New Land Music)
 2010 The Quantum Activist Soundtrack (Bluedot Productions)

Video
 1996 Bass Essentials (Hot Licks)
 1998 The Artist’s Profile: Michael Manring (Ecliptic productions)
 1998 Bass Day '98 (Hudson Music)
 2000 Michael Manring: Instructional Bass (Video, Hal Leonard)
 2008 Michael Manring: Resonances (DVD, Resonance Prod LLC/Michael Manring)
 2009 The Quantum Activist Documentary Soundtrack (Bluedot Productions)

References

External links

Ask Steve Lawson and Michael Manring forum at TalkBass.com
Solo Bass Night A recurring Bay Area, California solo bass show featuring Michael Manring
Official Peter Princiotto website
– the official DEMANIA site
Bassist Michael Manring, an Interview With Editor Jake Kot
Michael Manring: A Review of the May 2009 Portland OR Concert, 8/01/2009
Michael Manring Interview with Blogger Tommy Landry, 2011

New-age musicians
Chamber jazz bass guitarists
Berklee College of Music alumni
Living people
1960 births
Windham Hill Records artists
People from Annapolis, Maryland
Guitarists from Washington, D.C.
Musicians from the San Francisco Bay Area
Musicians from Norfolk, Virginia
20th-century American bass guitarists
Guitarists from California
Montreux (band) members
At War with Self members